Evian (stylized as evian) is a French company that bottles and commercialises mineral water from several sources near Évian-les-Bains, on the south shore of Lake Geneva. It produces over 2 billion plastic bottles per year.

Today, Evian is owned by Danone, a French multinational corporation. In addition to the mineral water, Danone Group uses the Evian name for a line of organic skin care products as well as a luxury resort in France.

History 
The water at Evian was first claimed to be beneficial for your health by Jean-Charles de Laizer, Count of Laizer, during 1789.

Evian first became a public company in 1859 as the "Société anonyme des eaux minérales de Cachat" and a year later it became French when Savoy was incorporated into France under the Treaty of Turin. The French Ministry of Health reauthorized the bottling of Cachat water on the recommendation of the Medicine Academy in 1878. In 1908 Evian water began to be sold in glass bottles manufactured by the glass factory Souchon-Neuvesel, which today is a part of Owens-Illinois. The first PVC bottle was launched in 1969.

During the following year, the BSN Group, which eventually became the Danone Group, took 100% control of the Évian brand. 1978 marked an entrance into the U.S. market. In 1995 Evian switched to collapsible PET bottles.

Production

Evian's site in the French Alps was, during 2015, the largest production facility operating within the French borders. The company produces 6 million plastic bottles per day, over 2 billion per year.

Public perception, marketing and advertising 

In popular culture, Evian is portrayed as a luxury and expensive bottled water. It was named in Agatha Christie's Murder on the Orient Express. It is popular among Hollywood celebrities. David LaChapelle photographed an evian campaign juxtaposing a supermodel next to an Evian fountain formed from a Greek statue, which was painted to look like stone by Joanne Gair. The brand frequently collaborates with high-fashion designers for a series of limited edition bottles. Diane von Fürstenberg designed the limited edition bottle for 2013, Elie Saab for 2014, Kenzo for 2015, Alexander Wang for 2016, Christian Lacroix for 2017, and Chiara Ferragni for 2018.

Evian worked with Virgin Records and EMI in 1998 for the mix album Club Nation. The album featured many advertisements for Évian, including a logo on the cover, six full pages in the booklet, the image of a bottle of Évian on CD1 and a crushed bottle of Évian on CD2.

In 2009, Evian launched the advertisement campaign, "Evian Roller Babies". The campaign won a Gold Award at the London International Awards 2009 for Best Visual Effects.

Evian brand ambassadors include singer Dua Lipa and tennis player Emma Raducanu.

In 2014, Evian collaborated with The Amazing Spider-Man 2 to create an advertisement, gaining 150+ million views on YouTube.

Environmentalism

In April 2008, Evian created the Evian Water Protection Institute to work on three water and wetlands management projects with the Ramsar Convention. The three areas where the projects will take place are Thailand's Bung Khong, the La Plata Basin in Argentina, and the Jagdishpur Reservoir in Nepal. Evian has also taken the initiative to cut their own energy and water use by incorporating post-consumer recycled PET plastic into the bottle sizes that receive the most sales. The company has joined with RecycleBank in an effort to get consumers to recycle. Recyclebank is an award-based company that gives participating households redeemable points according to the amount of materials they recycle.

During 2018, Evian announced that it will make all of its plastic bottles from 100% recycled plastic by 2025, a move that will see the natural spring water brand adopt a ‘circular approach’ to its plastic usage, where plastic is kept within the economy and out of nature. In order to achieve its 2025 ambition, Evian is partnering with breakthrough technology companies, one of which is Loop Industries. Loop Industries has developed a technology that enables a continuous loop for recycling at large scale, transforming all types of PET plastic waste into the high-quality plastic required by Evian.

During April 2020, Evian became the first Danone brand to achieve carbon neutrality.

See also
 Évian-les-Bains, the namesake town
 Badoit and Perrier, other brands of French mineral water

References

External links

 

Bottled water brands
French brands
French drinks
Groupe Danone brands
Mineral water
Companies based in Auvergne-Rhône-Alpes
1829 establishments in Europe
Food and drink companies established in 1829
French companies established in 1829
History of Savoy
Haute-Savoie